List of Cork senior ladies' football team captains features ladies' Gaelic footballers who have captained Cork in All-Ireland Senior Ladies' Football Championship finals and Ladies' National Football League finals.

List of captains

Notes
  Rena Buckley was the first player to captain Cork teams to both the All-Ireland Senior Ladies' Football Championship and the All-Ireland Senior Camogie Championship. In 2012 she captained the Cork senior ladies' football team. In 2017 she captained the Cork senior camogie team.
  In the 2016 Ladies' National Football League final, Deirdre O'Reilly lifted the trophy in the absence of the injured captain, Ciara O'Sullivan.

References

Ladies' Gaelic football
 
Cork
Cork